Physics of the Earth and Planetary Interiors, established in October 1967, is a biweekly peer-reviewed scientific journal published by Elsevier. The co-editors are A. Ferreira (University College London), K. Hirose (Tokyo Institute of Technology), D. Jault (Grenoble Alpes University), and C. Michaut (Ecole normale superieure de Lyon).

The journal covers the physical and chemical processes of planetary interiors. Topical coverage broadly encompasses planetary physics, geodesy, and geophysics. Publishing formats include original research papers, review articles, short communications and book reviews on a regular basis. Occasional special issues are set aside for proceedings of conferences. 

The journal has a 2020 impact factor of 2.261.

Abstracting and indexing
This journal is indexed in the following bibliographic databases:

 Science Citation Index
 Current Contents/Physical, Chemical & Earth Sciences
 Chemical Abstracts Service – CASSI
 AGI's Bibliography and Index of Geology
 GEOBASE
 Inspec
 PASCAL
 Physics Abstracts
 Scopus

See also 
 Earth and Planetary Science Letters
 Astronomy & Geophysics

References

External links 
 

Geophysics journals
English-language journals
Biweekly journals
Elsevier academic journals
Publications established in 1967